Janet Marie Rogers (born January 29, 1963) is a First Nations Mohawk/Tuscarora writer from the Ontario Six Nations. Her work includes poetry and spoken-word performance poetry.

Early life 
Rogers was born in Vancouver. Since 1994, she has lived on the traditional lands of the Coast Salish people in Victoria on Vancouver Island. First working as a visual artist, she began writing in 1996. Janet Rogers moved to the Six Nations reserve in June 2019, where she is initiating a book press Ojistah Publishing and a Six Nations Inaugural Literary Award (SNILA).

Published works

Poetry 
 Splitting the Heart (2007) Ekstasis Editions
 Red Erotic (2010) Ojistoh Publishing
 Unearthed (2011) Leaf Press
 Peace in Duress (2014) Talon Books
 Totem Poles and Railroads (2016) ARP Books
 As Long as the Sun Shines (2018) Bookland Press, Mohawk edition translated by Jeremy Green (2019)
 “Ego of a Nation” (2021) Ojistoh Publishing

Recordings 
 Firewater (2009)
 Got Your Back (2012)
 6 Directions (2013)
 As Long As the Sun Shines (2018) companion recording on reverbnation

Awards 
Rogers has been nominated in the category Best Spoken Word Recording at the Canadian Aboriginal Music Awards, the Aboriginal Peoples Choice Music Awards and the Native American Music Awards.
She has also been featured at the Vancouver Youth Poetry Slam, where she performed her spoken word poem "Opposite Directions" in 2013.

Rogers has hosted the radio programs Native Waves Radio on CFUV and Tribal Clefs on CBC Radio One Victoria. She produced the radio documentaries Bring Your Drum: 50 Years of Indigenous Protest Music Resonating Reconciliation, which received awards for Best Radio at the imagineNATIVE Film + Media Arts Festival. She produced a 6-part radio documentary titled NDNs on the Airwaves 2016 and a short doc of the same title with her media team 2Ro Media.

From January 2012 to November 2014, Rogers was City of Victoria's Poet Laureate. In 2015, she was named writer in residence for the University of Northern British Columbia. In September 2018, Rogers began a year-long writer in residence position at the University of Alberta.

Rogers formed the collective Ikkwenyes (Dare to Do) with Mohawk poet Alex Jacobs. The collective has received a Collaborative Exchange Award from the Canada Council for the Arts and a Loft Literary Fellowship prize from The Loft Literary Center.

References

External links 
 

1963 births
Living people
Canadian women poets
Tuscarora people
Canadian Mohawk people
21st-century Canadian poets
First Nations poets
21st-century Canadian women writers
First Nations women writers
21st-century First Nations writers
Six Nations of the Grand River